The 1844 United States presidential election in Virginia took place between November 1 and December 4, 1844, as part of the 1844 United States presidential election. Voters chose 17 representatives, or electors to the Electoral College, who voted for President and Vice President.

Virginia voted for the Democratic candidate, James K. Polk, over Whig candidate Henry Clay. Polk won Virginia by a margin of 6.10%.

Results

References

Virginia
1844
1844 Virginia elections